Dowlatabad (also romanized as Dowlatābād, Dowlatâbâd, and Daulatābad) is the city and capital of Zaveh County, Razavi Khorasan Province, Iran. At the 2006 census, its population was 8,740, in 2,334 families.

References 

Populated places in Zaveh County
Cities in Razavi Khorasan Province